Atropatene, also known as Media Atropatene, was an ancient Iranian kingdom established in  by the Persian satrap Atropates. The kingdom, centered in present-day northern Iran, was ruled by Atropates' descendants until the early 1st-century AD, when the Parthian Arsacid dynasty supplanted them. It was conquered by the Sasanians in 226, and turned into a province governed by a marzban ("margrave"). Atropatene was the only Iranian region to remain under Zoroastrian authority from the Achaemenids to the Arab conquest without interruption, aside from being briefly ruled by the Macedonian king Alexander the Great.

The name of Atropatene was also the nominal ancestor of the name of the historic Azerbaijan region in Iran.

Name 
According to Strabo, the name of Atropatene derived from the name of Atropates, the commander of the Achaemenid Empire. As he writes in his book “Geography”: "Media is divided into two parts. One part of it is called Greater Media, of which the metropolis is Ecbatana. The other part is Atropatian Media, which got its name from the commander Atropates, who prevented also this country, which was a part of Greater Media, from becoming subject to the Macedonians".

From the name of Atropates, different forms of the name of this country such as Atropatene, Atropatios Mēdia, Tropatene, Aturpatakan, Adarbayjan were used in different sources. Nevertheless, medieval Arab geographers suggested another version associating this name with Adorbador (the name of a priest) that means “guardian of the fire”.

History

In 331 BC, during the Battle of Gaugamela between the Achaemenid ruler Darius III and Alexander the Great, Medes, Albans, Sakasens, Cadusians fought alongside the army of the Achaemenid Great King in the army of Atropates. After this war, which resulted in the victory of Alexander the Great and the fall of the Achaemenid Empire, Atropates expressed his loyalty to Alexander. In 328-327 BC, Alexander appointed him governor of Media. Following the death of Alexander the Great in 323 BC, the Macedonian's conquests were divided amongst the diadochi at the Partition of Babylon. The former Achaemenid satrapy of Media was divided into two states: The greater (southern) part – Media Magna was assigned to Peithon, one of Alexander's bodyguards.

The smaller (northern) region, which had been the sub-satrapy of Matiene, became Media Atropatene under Atropates, the former Achaemenid governor of all Media, who had by then become father-in-law of Perdiccas, regent of Alexander's designated successor. Shortly thereafter, Atropates refused to pay allegiance to Seleucus, and made Media Atropatene an independent kingdom. In 223 BCE, Antiochus III came to power in the Seleucid Empire, one of the Hellenistic states that had emerged following the death of Alexander. Antiochus attacked Atropatene, resulting in a victory.

Consequently, the king of Atropatene, Artabazan, accepted the ascendency of Seleucids and became dependent on it; on the other hand, interior independence was preserved. At the same time, the Roman Empire came into sight in the Mediterranean basin and was trying to spread its power in the East, and in 190 B.C., its army met and defeated the Seleucids' army in the battle of Magnesia. Parthia and Atropatene subsequently considered Rome a threat to their independence and allied themselves in the struggle against Rome.

After the battle between Rome and the Parthians in 38 BC, the Romans won and the Roman general Antony attacked Fraaspa (36 BC), one of the central cities of Atropatene. The city was surrounded by strong defenses. After a long blockade, Antony receded, losing approximately thirty-five thousand soldiers. In the face of Parthian attempts to annex Atropatene, Atropatene began to draw closer to Rome, thus, Ariobarzan II, who came to power in Atropatene in 20 BC, lived in Rome for about ten years. The dynasty Atropates founded would rule the kingdom for several centuries, first independently, then as vassals of the Arsacids (who called it 'Aturpatakan'). It was later supplanted by a line of the Arsacids.

During the late Parthian era, the empire was declining, resulting in the weakening of hold over western Iran. The Iranologist Touraj Daryaee argues that the reign of the Parthian monarch Vologases V was "the turning point in Arsacid history, in that the dynasty lost much of its prestige." The people of Atropatene (both nobility and peasantry) allied themselves with the Persian Sasanian prince Ardashir I during his wars against Vologases V's son and second successor Artabanus IV. In 226, Atropatene submitted with little resistance to Ardashir I after he had defeated and killed Artabanus IV at the Battle of Hormozdgan. Ardashir I and his son and heir Shapur I are depicted in a rock relief near Salmas, possibly a testimonial to the Sasanian conquest of Atropatene. The nobility of Atropatene most likely allied themselves the Sasanians due to a desire for a strong state capable of maintaining order. The priesthood, who may have felt alienated by the easy-going Arsacids, probably also supported the Sasanian family, due to its association with Zoroastrianism.

Zoroastrianism 
The oldness of Zoroastrianism led to lack of knowledge about the geography of the Avesta, and also uncertainty about the birthplace of its prophet, Zoroaster. As a result local claims emerged quite easily, and with the appropriate support, even gained acceptance. This resulted in the birthplace of Zoroaster being placed in Atropatene, rather than the east, where he was in reality from.

Capital
The main Achaemenid hub in Atropatene was Ganzak (from Median: Ganzaka, meaning "treasury"), which presumably served as the capital of Atropates and his successors. The city was situated in a fertile area near Lake Urmia, close to the modern town of Miandoab. The city and its surroundings probably hosted a large Iranian population, whereas much of the Atropatenian population had most likely not been completely Iranianized yet by the 3rd-century BC.

Legacy 
Atropatene was the only Iranian region to remain under Zoroastrian authority from the Achaemenids to the Arab conquest without any interruption, aside from being briefly ruled by the Macedonian king Alexander the Great. Under the Atropatids, the region successfully managed to gain a dominant place in Zoroastrianism, which would continue into the Sasanian period, whose monarchs favored Median traditions over that of the Parthians. Moreover, Atropatene also served as a stronghold of Iranian culture.

List of rulers
Albeit the kings of Atropatene ruled for several centuries, only some of them are known. The dates of their reign are uncertain.

References

Bibliography

Ancient works 
 Strabo, Geographica.

Modern works 

 
 
 
 
 
 
 
 
 
 
 
  (2 volumes)
 
 
 
 

3rd-century disestablishments
History of Iran
States and territories established in the 4th century BC
States and territories disestablished in the 3rd century
Former countries in the Middle East
 
History of Azerbaijan (Iran)
Iranian dynasties
 
Former kingdoms